Rhodogastria is a genus of moths in the family Erebidae from South Africa. The genus was erected by Jacob Hübner in 1819. Formerly this genus name was mistakenly used for Amerila species.

Species
Rhodogastria amasis (Cramer, 1779)
Rhodogastria similis (Möschler, 1884)

References

Spilosomina
Moth genera